Octav Mayer ( – 9 September 1966) was a Romanian mathematician, the first to earn a doctorate in Romania.

He completed his Ph.D. at Alexandru Ioan Cuza University of Iași in 1920; his thesis, written under the direction of Alexander Myller, was titled Contributions à la théorie des quartiques bicirculaires.

The Octav Mayer Institute of Mathematics of the Romanian Academy (located in Iași) is named after him.

References

External links
 

1895 births
1966 deaths
People from Mizil
Romanian mathematicians
Alexandru Ioan Cuza University alumni
Members of the Romanian Academy of Sciences